The 2009 Copa Indonesia Final was a football match that took place on 28 June 2009 at Jakabaring Stadium in Palembang. It was the fourth final of Piala Indonesia and  contested by Sriwijaya FC and Persipura Jayapura. It was Sriwijaya's second consecutive final having won the title last year. For Persipura, this was their third successive final appearance having lost their previous two, including a penalty shootout defeat to Sriwijaya in their most recent final.

Persipura walked out of the match in the 60th minute to protest the officiating when Sriwijaya were leading 1–0. In the aftermath, Sriwijaya were awarded a 4–0 win and retained their title. As winners, they gained entry to the 2010 AFC Champions League qualifying play-off.

Road to the final

Note: In all results below, the score of the finalist is given first (H: home; A: away).

Match details

See also
2009 Copa Indonesia

References

External links
Official site Liga Indonesia

2009
2008–09 in Indonesian football